George Simpson (1880–1952) was a New Zealand naturalist and botanist. He was born in Dunedin, the son of a master builder. He, too, became a builder and valuer,  working as Crown Valuer from about 1943 until early 1950. However, he, together with John Scott Simpson, became interested in collecting and growing New Zealand native plants and by 1925 both were well known within the New Zealand botanical community.

In 1930 he was elected a fellow of the Linnean Society, In 1945, he published his monograph on Carmichaelia. In 1949 he was elected a fellow of the Royal Society of New Zealand, FRSNZ.

Names published 
(List incomplete: 74 names published)
 Myosotis ramificata G.Simpson, Trans. & Proc. Roy. Soc. N. Z. lxxix. 426 (1952). 
 Myosotis tenuis G.Simpson & J.S.Thomson, Trans. & Proc. Roy. Soc. N. Z. lxxiii. 161 (1943).
 Wahlenbergia laxa G.Simpson, Trans. & Proc. Roy. Soc. N. Z. lxxix. 430 (1952).
 Wahlenbergia ramosa G.Simpson, Trans. & Proc. Roy. Soc. N. Z. lxxv. 196 (1945).
 Brachyscome brevifolia G.Simpson, Trans. & Proc. Roy. Soc. N. Z. lxxix. 432 (1952).
 Celmisia spedeni G.Simpson, Trans. & Proc. Roy. Soc. N. Z. lxxv. 200 (1945).
Carmichaelia solandri G.Simpson, Trans. & Proc. Roy. Soc. N. Z. lxxv. 253 (1945). (synonym of Carmichaelia australis R.Br.)
Carmichaelia appressa G.Simpson, Trans. & Proc. Roy. Soc. N. Z. lxxv. 263 (1945).
Carmichaelia astonii G.Simpson, Trans. & Proc. Roy. Soc. N. Z. lxxv. 253 (1945).
Carmichaelia hollowayi G.Simpson, Trans. & Proc. Roy. Soc. N. Z. lxxv. 277 (1945).
(These may not be accepted names.)

Eponymy
(From Godley, 1997)
Ranunculus simpsonii 
Ourissia sessifolia var. simpsonii 
Wahlenburgia simpsonii J.A.Hay (synonym of Wahlenbergia albomarginata subsp. flexilis (Petrie) J.A.Petterson

References

1880 births
1952 deaths
20th-century New Zealand botanists
Fellows of the Royal Society of New Zealand